Perry Meridian High School is a high school in Indianapolis, Indiana.  It is one of two public high schools serving grades nine through twelve in the Perry Township, along with Southport High School. Enrollment surpassed 2,350 students during the 2019-2020 school year, with Asian, African-American, Hispanic and multi-racial students making up a slight majority of the high school population. More than 20,000 Burmese (Chin) refugees and extended family members have moved to the Southside since 2000,  boosting Perry Meridian's Asian-American population above 25 percent overall by 2019.

Perry Meridian High School is part of Perry Township Schools.

The school colors are Navy Blue, Powder Blue and Silver. The school mascot is the Falcon.

History
Perry Meridian opened its doors in the fall of 1973 under principal James Head. Students and teachers came from Southport High School, which had been the only high school in Perry Township.  Perry Meridian only enrolled grades 9-11 during its first year.  Southport students picked the school colors and mascot for Perry during the 1972-73 school year.

Notable alumni
Blair St. Clair - drag queen
Dylan Windler - basketball player (Cleveland Cavaliers)
Katie Douglas - professional basketball player
Mike Neu - head football coach at Ball State University
Andre Owens - professional basketball player

See also
 List of high schools in Indiana

References

External links
Official website

Schools in Indianapolis
Public high schools in Indiana
Educational institutions established in 1973
1973 establishments in Indiana